Mick Garris (born December 4, 1951) is an American filmmaker and screenwriter born in Santa Monica, California. He is best known for his work in the horror film genre, as well as making Stephen King adaptations.

Early life
Garris was born in Santa Monica, California and raised in Van Nuys.

Career 
He is known for his work in the horror genre. He has worked with Stephen King several times, such as directing the horror film Sleepwalkers, written by King and starring Mädchen Amick and is the creator of the Showtime series Masters of Horror and the NBC series Fear Itself. Garris won a 1986 Edgar Award for an episode he wrote for the Steven Spielberg-produced television series Amazing Stories. Garris directed the FEARnet web series Post Mortem. He contributes to the web series Trailers From Hell. Garris was also the co-screenwriter and executive producer of Hocus Pocus. Garris directed the 2011 miniseries adaption of Stephen King's novel Bag of Bones and the documentary film Pure in Heart: The Life and Legacy of Lon Chaney Jr., about the life and work of Legend actor Lon Chaney Jr., which screened on the Horror-Rama 2015 in October 2015. He has a role, as Himself in the biography horror film Digging Up the Marrow, from indie director Adam Green.

As of 2015, he is also a member of the board of advisers for the Hollywood Horror Museum.

On January 16, 2018 it was announced that Mick Garris’ horror podcast Post Mortem would be joining Blumhouse's podcast network.

Awards
Garris received the Lifetime Achievement Award at the 2006 New York City Horror Film Festival. He received the award in person after a screening of his Masters of Horror episode "Valerie on the Stairs".

Filmography

Films

Television

References

External links

Mick Garris on FEARnet
Interview

1951 births
American male screenwriters
American television directors
American television writers
Horror film directors
Edgar Award winners
Living people
Writers from Santa Monica, California
Film directors from California
American male television writers
Screenwriters from California